Cristoforo Benigno Crespi (18 October 1833 in Busto Arsizio – 5 January 1920 in Milan) was an Italian entrepreneur.

Biography
In 1897 a cotton textile industry was created in the province of Milan and the factory and its worker village, called Crespi d'Adda was built on the left bank of the river Adda between the towns of Capriate San Gervasio and Canonica d’Adda where the flow of water provided hydroelectric energy to power the cotton looms. It was in full production until the economic crash of 1929 when the family went bankrupt but was still producing in limited output up until its closure in 2004. Descendants of the original workers still live in the village. It has been a UNESCO World Heritage Site since 1995.

His son, Silvio Benigno Crespi, was among the world's most powerful men at the time and signed the Treaty of Versailles at the end of the First World War on behalf of Italy.

References

1833 births
1920 deaths
People from Busto Arsizio
Crespi family